"Someone Else's Dream" is a song written by Trey Bruce and Craig Wiseman, and recorded by American country music artist Faith Hill. It was released in January 1996 as the third single from her second album, It Matters to Me (1995). The song peaked at number three on the US Billboard country charts.

Critical reception
Deborah Evans Price from Billboard said, "Here is yet another fine cut from Hill's strong album, "It Matters To Me". This song proves you can have radio-ready uptempo tunes with meaty lyrics. Just because a song makes you tap your toes does not mean it has to be devoid of lyrical integrity. On both lyrical and musical terms, this song is a winner—thanks in large part to Hill's affecting vocals. Her country phrasing and inflection underscore the live-your-own-life message in the lyric. Great song." Wendy Newcomer from Cash Box wrote, "Finding positive and uplifting songs for female singers these days is about as easy as finding a male singer who doesn’t wear tight jeans. But Hill has found a song that fits the bill (and her sweetheart image)—she sings the heck out of it, too. If women truly are the buyers and target audience of country music, this single should hit the bullseye."

Charts

Weekly charts

Year-end charts

References

1996 singles
1995 songs
Faith Hill songs
Songs written by Trey Bruce
Songs written by Craig Wiseman
Song recordings produced by Scott Hendricks
Warner Records Nashville singles